Wikstroemia elliptica is a shrub, of the family Thymelaeaceae.  It is native to Guam and Micronesia.

Description
The shrub has smooth reddish bark and small light green leaves. Its flowers bloom yellowish green and bear bright red fruit. It is often found on volcanic and limestone soils and savannah terrain.

References

elliptica
Taxa named by Elmer Drew Merrill